State of Siege is a 1972 French–Italian–West German political thriller film directed by Costa-Gavras starring Yves Montand and Renato Salvatori. The story is based on an actual incident in 1970, when U.S. official Dan Mitrione was kidnapped and later killed by an urban guerilla group in Uruguay.

Plot
Philip Michael Santore, an official of the United States Agency for International Development, is found shot in a car after an extensive raid by police and military forces. In a flashback which takes up almost the entire film, State of Siege tells of his kidnapping by the Tupamaro guerrilla group, whose members confront him with his involvement in the training of the Uruguayan police, including interrogation techniques and torture to be used on opponents of the authoritarian regime. The Tupamaros demand the release of all political prisoners from the government in exchange for Santore, but the government declines. When a large number of the group's members are arrested, the remaining fraction decides to kill their hostage. The final scene shows the arrival of a new U.S. official to replace Santore.

Cast
 Yves Montand as Philip Michael Santore
 Renato Salvatori as Captain Lopez
 O. E. Hasse as Carlos Ducas
 Jacques Weber as Hugo
 Jean-Luc Bideau as Este
 Maurice Teynac as Minister of Internal Security
 Yvette Etiévant as Woman Senator
 Evangeline Peterson as Mrs. Santore
 Harald Wolff as Minister of Foreign Affairs
 Nemesio Antúnez as President Jorge Pacheco Areco
 Mario Montilles as Assistant Commissioner Fontant
 André Falcon as Deputy Fabbri
 Jacques Perrin as Telephone operator
 Juan Guzmán Tapia as Journalist (uncredited)

Production
Though the setting of State of Siege is never explicitly named, signages throughout the film refer to Montevideo, and the Tupamaros are mentioned by name. Costa-Gavras, living in Paris at the time and preparing his film The Confession, had learned of Mitrione's case in French newspaper Le Monde and decided to make further investigations in Uruguay himself, accompanied by screenwriter Franco Solinas (The Battle of Algiers). The film was shot in Chile during the brief democratic socialist rule of Salvador Allende, just before the 1973 Chilean coup d'état, which Costa-Gavras would dramatise in his later film Missing. Although Allende supported Costa-Gavras' project, the director faced opposition both from Chilean Communist Party members and the conservative mayor of Santiago Province commune Las Condes during filming.

The role of the government's president is played by Chilean painter Nemesio Antúnez.

Release and reception
State of Siege became the subject of controversial discussions upon its US release. While liberal critics supported the film, it was attacked by conservative commentators for falsely indicting the US (Smith Hempstone) and presenting a "profoundly fraudulent" portrait of Mitrione (Ernest W. Lefever). A planned screening during a festival organised by the American Film Institute in the John F. Kennedy Center, Washington, D.C., in April 1973, was cancelled by the AFI's director George Stevens, arguing that the film "rationalizes an act of political assassination". Protesting Stevens' decision, twelve filmmakers withdrew their films from the festival, including François Truffaut. John F. Kennedy's former staff member Theodore Sorenson defended State of Siege as a simplistic but "important work" in an article in the New York Times.

Awards
 Prix Louis-Delluc 1972

References

Further reading

External links
 

1972 films
1970s political thriller films
French political thriller films
Italian political thriller films
West German films
German political thriller films
1970s French-language films
Films directed by Costa Gavras
Films about Latin American military dictatorships
Louis Delluc Prize winners
Films set in 1970
Films set in Uruguay
Films set in Montevideo
Films shot in Chile
Films scored by Mikis Theodorakis
Tupamaros
Guerrilla warfare in film
1970s Italian films
1970s French films
1970s German films